Paul Kohlhoff (born 26 June 1995) is a German sailor. 
He represented Germany, along with partner Carolina Werner, in the Nacra 17 class at the 2016 Summer Olympics in Rio de Janeiro, and at the 2020 Summer Olympics, with Alica Stuhlemmer, winning the bronze medal.

Career 
He competed at the 2018 Hempel Sailing World Championships Aarhus, 2019 World Championships, and 2020 World Championships.

References

External links 
 Germany's hope in Nacra 17: Paul Kohlhoff and Alica Stuhlemmer (Kiel)
 
 
 
 

1995 births
Living people
German male sailors (sport)
Olympic sailors of Germany
Olympic bronze medalists for Germany
Olympic medalists in sailing
Sailors at the 2016 Summer Olympics – Nacra 17
Sailors at the 2020 Summer Olympics – Nacra 17
Medalists at the 2020 Summer Olympics
Nacra 17 class sailors
Sportspeople from Bremen